The 1936 CCNY Beavers football team represented the City College of New York (CCNY) during the 1936 college football season.  In its third season  under head coach Benny Friedman, the team compiled a record of 4–4.

Schedule

References

CCNY
CCNY Beavers football seasons
CCNY Beavers football